Piano Sonata No. 9 may refer to: 
Piano Sonata No. 9 (Beethoven)
Piano Sonata No. 9 (Mozart)
Piano Sonata No. 9 (Scriabin)
Piano Sonata No. 9 (Prokofiev)